The Lake Shawnee Amusement Park is a defunct amusement park in Princeton, West Virginia, United States, located along Lake Shawnee. Opened in 1926, the park operated for 62 years before closing in 1988. It received public attention for at least 2 deaths that occurred on the premises during its operations, which led to urban legends regarding the park being haunted, in an early instance of the Indian burial ground trope. There were a total of 6 deaths.

History
The land on which the amusement park was built was the site of a massacre after landowner Mitchell Clay's children were targeted by Native Americans. Two of the children had been killed while a third was captured and taken to Chillicothe and burned at the stake. 

In 1926, an entrepreneur named C.T. Snidow purchased the land and began developing an amusement park for the people of Mercer County, West Virginia. The park, which featured a ferris wheel and a swing ride, was popular among locals in the county, particularly families of coal miners who resided in the area. It also featured a swimming pool, race track, concession stands, dance hall, and cabins for overnight stays. The park was closed in 1967 because of a failed health inspection. 

In 1985, Gaylord White, a former employee who had worked at the park, purchased the land with plans to reopen it, and briefly reopened it in the summer of 1987. However, the park closed after a 1988 archeological dig uncovered numerous Native American artifacts, as well as human remains on the property that had been buried prior to the arrival of Anglo-European settlers. A total of thirteen skeletons were uncovered, mostly of young children. White briefly reopened the park, but it was closed after three years. Since its closure, the park has hosted guided paranormal tours.

In the media

Television   
Due to these local legends, the park was featured on the television series Scariest Places on Earth in 2002 which aired on ABC Family.

The abandoned Lake Shawnee Amusement Park was also showcased on the part 5 episode of Most Terrifying Places in America which aired on the Travel Channel in 2010.

In 2010, Everyday Paranormal featured Lake Shawnee Amusement Park in Season 2 of Discovery Channel's Ghost Lab.

In 2019, Lake Shawnee Amusement Park was also featured in a haunted locations on the paranormal TV series, Most Terrifying Places which aired on Travel Channel.

The park was also featured on the paranormal TV series, The UnXplained which aired on History Channel in 2019.

The park was featured in a 2021 episode of Portals to Hell with Jack Osbourne.

References

Sources

External links

Lake Shawnee Amusement Park at Abandoned
Lake Shawnee Amusement Park at Mercer County Visitors and Convention Bureau

1926 establishments in West Virginia
Defunct amusement parks in the United States
Reportedly haunted locations in West Virginia
Modern ruins